"Deepest Blue" is the debut single of British house music duo Deepest Blue. It was originally written by Joel Edwards and produced by Anthony Mein. After the first version of the song did not gain any interest, it was taken to Matt Schwartz for new production, and he wrote a new backing track and chorus in the studio. Mein did not appear in the final act line-up as he had moved to Thailand and was not in the studio when the record was re-done. Released on 21 July 2003, the single became a hit, reaching number seven on the UK Singles Chart and experiencing moderate success in Flanders, Ireland, and the Netherlands.

Background
The duo's eponymous song derives its title from a computing accident that occurred when the words 'deepest blue' came up on the screen when Edwards pressed 'save', whilst the content was inspired by Coldplay's "Yellow". In an interview with Zoe Smith for The Guardian, Edwards said, "It's just the first sentiment of Chris Martin's opening line. When he sings, 'Look at the stars/ Look how they shine for you...' I thought that was such an awesome sentiment. Imagine writing that for some love of yours and how heartfelt it sounds."

Track listings

UK and Australian CD single
 "Deepest Blue" (radio edit)
 "Deepest Blue" (Jon Hopkins mix)
 "Deepest Blue" (original mix)
 "Deepest Blue" (Electrique Boutique vocal remix)

UK 12-inch single
A1. "Deepest Blue" (original mix)
B1. "Deepest Blue" (Electrique Boutique remix)
B2. "Deepest Blue" (Lee-Cabrera remix)

UK cassette single
 "Deepest Blue" (radio edit)
 "Deepest Blue" (original mix)
 "Deepest Blue" (Electrique Boutique vocal remix)

Dutch CD single
 "Deepest Blue" (radio edit) – 3:27
 "Deepest Blue" (Electrique Boutique remix) – 8:41
 "Deepest Blue" (original mix) – 7:34
 "Deepest Blue" (Lee Cabrera remix) – 7:42
 "Deepest Blue" (Jon Hopkins mix) – 3:31

US maxi-CD single
 "Deepest Blue" (radio edit)
 "Deepest Blue" (original mix)
 "Deepest Blue" (Lee Cabrera remix)

US 12-inch single
A1. "Deepest Blue" (original mix) – 7:34
A2. "Deepest Blue" (Lee Cabrera remix) – 7:42
B1. "Deepest Blue" (Electrique Boutique remix)

Charts

Weekly charts

Year-end charts

Release history

References

2003 debut singles
2003 songs
Data Records singles
Deepest Blue songs
Ministry of Sound singles
Songs written by Matt Schwartz
Ultra Records singles